Miguel Angel Amado Alanis (born 28 December 1984 in Rivera) is a Uruguayan footballer who plays as a midfielder for the Uruguayan Primera División side Peñarol on loan from Paraguayan Primera División league Club Olimpia and the Uruguay national football team.

International career
Miguel Amado made his international debut for Uruguay on 10 June 2009. He was in the starting line-up for a World Cup qualifying match against Venezuela, which ended as a 2-2 draw for both sides.
He has won 2 caps for the Uruguay national football team.

Honors

Club
Defensor Sporting 
 Primera División (1): 2007–08

External links
 Miguel Amado playing stats at ESPN: http://soccernet.espn.go.com/players/stats?id=88128&cc=5739

1984 births
Living people
People from Rivera Department
Uruguayan footballers
Uruguayan expatriate footballers
Uruguay international footballers
Defensor Sporting players
Peñarol players
Club Olimpia footballers
Uruguayan Primera División players
Uruguayan expatriate sportspeople in Paraguay
Expatriate footballers in Paraguay

Association football midfielders